Western River may refer to:
Western River (South Australia), a river on Kangaroo Island in South Australia.
Western River, South Australia, a locality
Western River Wilderness Protection Area, a protected area in South Australia
Western River Conservation Park, a former protected area in South Australia
 Western River Expedition, themed attraction designed for Walt Disney World in Florida, USA, but never built
 Western River Railroad, themed attraction at Tokyo Disneyland, Japan

See also
 West River (disambiguation)